Seyfarth is a German language surname that stems from the male given name Siegfried. Notable people with the name include:

Alex Seyfarth (born 1999), Australian professional rugby league footballer
Andreas Seyfarth (born 1962), German-style board game designer
Juliane Seyfarth (born 1990), German ski jumper
Jürgen Seyfarth (fl. 1981–1983), German rower
Robert Seyfarth (scientist) (born 1948), American primatologist and author
Robert Seyfarth (1878–1950), American architect

German-language surnames
Surnames from given names